Farmers and Merchants Bank Building, also known as The Wedge, is a historic bank building located at Monroe City, Monroe County, Missouri. It was erected in 1917, and is a wedge-shaped, flatiron building clad in tapestry brick.  It features an impressive canted entrance covered in glazed terra cotta tile with a granite base.

It was listed on the National Register of Historic Places in 2012.

References

Bank buildings on the National Register of Historic Places in Missouri
Commercial buildings completed in 1917
Buildings and structures in Monroe County, Missouri
National Register of Historic Places in Monroe County, Missouri